The 1990 Virginia Cavaliers football team represented the University of Virginia in the 1990 NCAA Division I-A football season. The Cavaliers offense scored 464 points while the defense allowed 227 points. Led by head coach George Welsh, the Cavaliers competed in the Sugar Bowl, losing 23-22.

This Virginia team is noteworthy for having achieved a No. 1 national ranking in the Associated Press college football poll for two weeks during the season, starting on October 16 of that year and ending with a loss to Georgia Tech. The Cavaliers held the nation's top spot through the poll of October 30, but losses in three of four games left them unranked in the AP poll by the end of the regular season.  It was the first time in the program's history that Virginia had ever earned the No. 1 ranking.

Schedule

Personnel

Game summaries

Georgia Tech

Team players in the NFL
The following were selected in the 1991 NFL Draft.

References

Virginia
Virginia Cavaliers football seasons
Virginia Cavaliers football